Oh, You Beautiful Doll is a 1949 musical film directed by John M. Stahl (his final film), starring the musical queen June Haver and Mark Stevens. Co-stars included S.Z. Sakall, Charlotte Greenwood, and Gale Robbins.

Plot 
The film is a fictionalized biography of Fred Fisher, a German-born American writer of Tin Pan Alley songs.  Tin Pan Alley promoter (Mark Stevens) turns serious composer Fred Breitenbach (S.Z. Sakall) into songwriter Fred Fisher.  Fred Fisher is his assumed name in real life and Breitenbach is his birth surname.  In the film, many Fisher songs were given a symphonic arrangement that was performed at Aeolian Hall. Among the Fisher songs heard were:

 Chicago
 Dardanella
 Peg O' My Heart
 Who paid the rent for Mrs. Rip Van Winkle? (1914)

Cast 
Leading actors

 Mark Stevens – Larry Kelly
 June Haver – Doris Fisher
 S.Z. Sakall – Fred Fisher aka Alfred Breitenbach
 Charlotte Greenwood – Anna Breitenbach
 Gale Robbins – Marie Carle
 Jay C. Flippen Lippy Brannigan
 Andrew Tombes – Ted Held
 Eduard Franz – Gottfried Steiner

Other cast

 Sam Ash – quartet
 Warren Jackson – quartet
 Donald Kerr – quartet
 Al Klein – quartet
 Frank Kreig – head waiter
 Nestor Paiva – Lucca

Uncredited cast

 Myrtle Anderson – cook
 Curt Bois – Zaltz
 Edward Clark – Cooper - desk clerk
 Tom Coleman – Policeman
 John Davidson – Davis - Steiner's secretary
 Sam Finn – minor role
 Joseph Forte – waiter
 Robert Gist – musician
 James Griffith – Joe - reporter
 Sam Harris – composer
 Eddie Kane – Charles Hubert
 Kenner G. Kemp – audience spectator
 Carl M. Leviness – composer (uncredited)
 Sidney Marion – minor role (uncredited)
 Marion Martin – big blonde
 Frank Mills – man in jail
 Eula Morgan – Madame Zoubel
 John Mylong – toastmaster
 William J. O'Brien – waiter
 Torchy Rand – Sophie - waitress
 Dick Rich – burly man in saloon
 Maurice Samuels – Italian
 Harry Seymour – Volk, nightclub M.C.
 Lester Sharpe – music store proprietor
 Ray Teal – policeman
 Phil Tully – desk sergeant
 Ray Walker – box office attendant
 Billy Wayne – reporter
 Robert Williams – police lieutenant
 Victor Sen Yung – houseboy

References

External links 

1949 films
1949 musical comedy films
1940s biographical films
American musical comedy films
American biographical films
20th Century Fox films
Films directed by John M. Stahl
Films about composers
Films set in the 1900s
American black-and-white films
1940s American films